Palmeira is a Portuguese parish, located in the municipality of Braga. The population in 2011 was 5,468, in an area of 8.88 km².

Braga Airport (Aérodromo Municipal de Braga)(BGZ) is located in Palmeira. The Circuito Vasco Sameiro is located at the airport.

Main sights
 Dona Chica Castle (Castelo de Dona Chica), from Ernesto Korrodi.
 Cávado rivervalley

References

Freguesias of Braga